The River Styx is an  tributary of Pine Creek in Gratiot County, Michigan, in the United States.  Its water flows via Pine Creek, the Maple River, and the Grand River to Lake Michigan.

See also
List of rivers of Michigan

References

Michigan Streamflow Data from the USGS

Rivers of Michigan
Rivers of Gratiot County, Michigan
Tributaries of Lake Michigan